Prof Sergei Ivanovich Tomkeieff FRSE FGS (1892–1968) was a 20th-century Russian and British geologist and petrologist who won the Geological Society's Lyell Medal in 1966.

Life
He was born on 20 October 1892 in Vilna (Russian Empire).

Studied petrology in Petrograd Polytechnic Institute.

He came to Britain either during or just after the First World War. He began lecturing in Geology at Anderson College in Newcastle-upon-Tyne in 1920.

In 1948 he was elected a Fellow of the Royal Society of Edinburgh. His proposers  were Arthur Holmes, James Ernest Richey, Sir Edward Battersby Bailey, Heslop Harrison, George Walter Tyrrell, John Weir, and H. B. Donald.

In 1957 he became Professor of Petrology at the Anderson College.

He died on 27 October 1968 in Newcastle aged 76.

Family
In 1931 he married Olive Gower Farmer, daughter of Amos Farmer.

Publications
Author of about 150 publications, among them:
The Tholeite Dyke at Cowgate (1953)
Coals, Bitumens and other Related Fossil Carbonaceous Substances (1954)
Isle of Arran (1961)
The Economic Geology of Quarried Materials (1969)
Dictionary of Petrology (1983) (posthumous)

References

Links 
 Obituarу: Professor S.I. Tomkeieff // Nature. 1968. Vol. 220. N 5170. P. 939.
 Bibliography and documents in Information System "History of Geology and Mining".

1892 births
1968 deaths
Scientists from Vilnius
Petrologists
Fellows of the Royal Society of Edinburgh
Lyell Medal winners